Roger Cavan Lambart, 13th Earl of Cavan (born 1 September 1944), is a hereditary peer.

Lord Cavan was educated at Wilson's School, Surrey, St Clare's International School and King's College London.

The title Earl of Cavan was created in the Peerage of Ireland in 1647 for Charles Lambart, 2nd Baron Lambart. Lord Cavan holds the subsidiary titles Viscount Kilcoursie, in the King's County (1647), and Lord Lambart, Baron of Cavan in the County of Cavan (1618), both also in the Peerage of Ireland.

The Earl of Cavan inherited the title from his relative, the 12th Earl. He is the descendant of Commander the Honourable Oliver Lambart, a younger son of the 7th Earl. His heir presumptive is Cavan C.E. Lambart (born 1957), a  distant cousin of the Italian Lambertini family.

References
 thePeerage.com

1944 births
Living people
People educated at Wilson's School, Wallington
Alumni of King's College London
People educated at St. Clare's, Oxford
British people of Irish descent
Earls of Cavan